Harvey Chandler (born 19 April 1995) is a former English professional snooker player from Northamptonshire.

Career
In August 2017, he came through three rounds of qualifying to play the main draw at the 2017 Paul Hunter Classic. He defeated Li Yuan to reach the round of 64.

In February 2018, Chandler won the EBSA European Snooker Championship in Bulgaria with a 7–2 victory over Jordan Brown. With this win, Chandler was granted a tour card for the 2018–19 professional snooker season.

Performance and rankings timeline

Career finals

Pro-am finals: 1

Amateur finals: 2 (1 title, 1 runner-up)

References

External links

Harvey Chandler at worldsnooker.com

1995 births
Living people
English snooker players
Sportspeople from Northamptonshire